Carl Sherman (October 16, 1890 – July 17, 1956) was an American lawyer and politician.

Life
Sherman was born in Olmütz, Austria, which is now Olomouc in the Czech Republic.  His parents, Sandor and Pauline (Opler) Sherman, brought the family to the United States in 1894, and Sandor Sherman worked as a tobacco merchant in Buffalo.  Carl Sherman graduated from Buffalo's Masten Park High School in 1908, and received his LL.B. degree from the University at Buffalo Law School in 1910.  Sherman lived and practiced law in Buffalo.

He was an Assistant United States Attorney in the Western District of New York appointed by President Woodrow Wilson. He was New York State Attorney General from 1923 to 1924, elected in 1922 but defeated for re-election in 1924.

He was a delegate to the 1924 and 1956 Democratic National Conventions, and an alternate delegate to the 1948 Democratic National Convention. He was Treasurer of the New York State Democratic Committee from 1945 to 1950.

He was a Vice President of the American Jewish Congress.

He died during a vacation in Larchmont, and was buried at the Cedar Park Cemetery in Paramus, New Jersey.

Sources
 Political Graveyard
 Directory of Jewish organizations, at AJC archives
 List of New York Attorneys General, at Office of the NYSAG
 His praise by Judge Hazel, in NYT on November 3, 1922

1890 births
1956 deaths
Politicians from Buffalo, New York
University at Buffalo Law School alumni
New York State Attorneys General
Jewish American people in New York (state) politics
People from Larchmont, New York
20th-century American politicians
Lawyers from Buffalo, New York
Austro-Hungarian emigrants to the United States
20th-century American lawyers
20th-century American Jews